Pseudoseisuropsis is a genus of extinct birds in the ovenbird family from the Pleistocene of Argentina and Uruguay. The genus was described in 1991 based on disarticulated skeletal elements and a nearly-complete skull. Although originally believed to be closely related to the extant genus Pseudoseisura, phylogenetic analyses suggested a more basal origin within the family.

Species
 Pseudoseisuropsis nehuen Noriega, 1991
 Pseudoseisuropsis cuelloi Claramunt & Rinderknecht, 2005
 Pseudoseisuropsis wintu Stefanini et al., 2016

References

Furnariidae
Pleistocene birds
Pleistocene animals of South America